Debra Hayward (born 15 April 1964) is a British film producer. As Head of Film at Working Title Films, Hayward frequently served as an executive producer for the company's feature films, working alongside fellow Working Title executive Liza Chasin. After producing Les Misérables, she started her own production company, Monumental Pictures.

Life and career
Born in Liverpool in 1964, the daughter of John I. Hayward and his wife Annetta Lansky, Hayward joined Working Title Films in 1989, working as a producer’s assistant on films that include Fools of Fortune and Dakota Road. She later became a development executive for the company, and produced several films such as London Kills Me and Map of the Human Heart. Hayward served as Head of Film for Working Title and was creatively responsible for the company’s entire slate of feature films in conjunction with her American counterpart, Liza Chasin. Both Hayward and Chasin have served as executive producers on films that include Bridget Jones's Diary, Atonement and The Boat That Rocked. More recently Hayward has worked on critically acclaimed hits Tinker Tailor Soldier Spy and Senna. September 2011 saw the launch of her new production company Monumental Pictures.

Hayward's first solo film as producer was Les Misérables, which went on to win multiple awards, raising her profile.

In 2014 she started her own production house, Monumental Pictures, with fellow producer Alison Owen.

On 14 October 2018, it was announced that late singer Amy Winehouse's family had respectively signed a multi-million pound deal with Hayward’s film company, Monumental Pictures to make a biopic about her life, which will be directed by Alison Owen and produced by Hayward.

She is married to the English screenwriter Will Osborne and has four children. He returned from California to marry Hayward, and they moved from London to Glandford, Norfolk.

Filmography

References

External links

1964 births
Living people
English film producers
Golden Globe Award-winning producers
British women film producers
People from Liverpool